Ernest Olver (27 July 1874 – 12 June 1943) was an English born South African international rugby union player who played as a wing. Olver became the 33rd  capped Springbok player when he was a member of the Springboks team to play against the British Isles in Port Elizabeth on 30 July 1896.

References

1874 births
1943 deaths
South African rugby union players
South Africa international rugby union players
Rugby union wings
Rugby union players from Cornwall
Eastern Province Elephants players
Emigrants from the United Kingdom to Cape Colony